Fort Resolution (Denı́nu Kų́ę́ (pronounced "deh-nih-noo-kwenh") "moose island place") is a hamlet in the South Slave Region of the Northwest Territories, Canada. The community is situated at the mouth of the Slave River, on the shores of Great Slave Lake, and at the end of the Fort Resolution Highway (Highway 6). It is the headquarters of the Deninu Kųę́ First Nation, whose Chief is Louis Balsillie.

It is the oldest documented European community in the Northwest Territories, built in 1819, and was a key link in the fur trade's water route north. Fort Resolution is designated as a National Historic Site of Canada as the oldest continuously occupied place in the Northwest Territories with origins in the fur trade and the principal fur trade post on Great Slave Lake.

Fort Resolution's Deninoo School offers K-12 schooling. The town also has a hockey arena, community hall, a nursing station, a youth centre, Royal Canadian Mounted Police, a bed and breakfast, a 'Northern' general store, a convenience store, one diner, and two gas stations. Fort Resolution Airport services charter and medivac flights only. The oldest building in town is the historic Roman Catholic Church, built in the early 19th century; there is also a Protestant church in the hamlet. The beach along Great Slave Lake is a prime spot for summer swimming, bird watching, fishing or relaxing. Local people engage in fishing, hunting, and trapping year-round.

The nearby site of Pine Point was once a thriving lead mine. When the value of lead plummeted in the 1980s, the Pine Point Mine closed, and the township was evacuated. Pine Point houses were sold cheaply, and many of the buildings were then moved to Fort Resolution (including the hockey arena), Hay River and Northern Alberta.

Deninoo Days in late August celebrate the beginning of moose hunting season with parades, traditional races, games and talent competitions. Recreational opportunities include camping, canoeing and fishing (self-guided, or available through several outfitters). Little Buffalo River Crossing is a nearby territorial park, with historical and natural attractions, accessible by road and featuring a campground with 12 sites.

Demographics 

In 2016, the majority of its population, 430, was listed as Indigenous. The majority of townspeople are of Dene (320) and Métis (105) descent. The predominant languages are English, Chipewyan and Michif.

First Nations
Fort Resolution is represented by the Deninu Kue First Nation and are part of the Akaitcho Territory Government.

Gallery

Notable people 
David Graeme Hancock, Q.C., 15th Premier of Alberta, 23 March–15 September 2014

Climate 
Fort Resolution has a subarctic climate (Dfc) with short, mild summers and long, cold winters lasting from October through April.

See also
 List of municipalities in the Northwest Territories

References

Further reading

 Deprez, P., & Bisson, A. (1975). Demographic differences between Indians and Métis in Fort Resolution. Winnipeg: Centre for Settlement Studies, University of Manitoba.
 Driedger, L. C. (1990). Kinship, marriage and residence in Fort Resolution, N.W.T. Ottawa: National Library of Canada. 
 Fields, G., & Sigurdson, G. (1972). Northern co-operatives as a strategy for community change; the case of Fort Resolution. Winnipeg: University of Manitoba, Centre for Settlement Studies.
 Fort Resolution Education Society. (1987). That's the way we lived an oral history of the Fort Resolution elders. Fort Resolution, N.W.T.: Fort Resolution Education Society.
 Kim, C. J.-H. (1996). Assessment of cadmium intake from the consumption of traditional food in Fort Resolution, Northwest Territories. Ottawa: National Library of Canada = Bibliothèque nationale du Canada. 
 Lafontaine, C. (1997). Concentrations of metals and trace elements in muscle and liver of fish collected from Great Slave Lake, Fort Resolution area, NWT final report. Yellowknife: The Division.
 Mercredi, M. (1988). An outline for a traditional skills camp proposed by the Fort Resolution Settlement Council. Yellowknife?: Govt. of the Northwest Territories].
 Smith, D. M. (1982). Moose-Deer island house people a history of the native people of Fort Resolution. Ottawa: National Museums of Canada.
 Smith, D. M. (1973). INKONZE: magico-religious beliefs of contract-traditional Chipewan trading at Fort Resolution, NWT, Canada. Mercury series. Ottawa: National Museum of Man, National Museums of Canada.
 Van Kessel, J. C. (2004). Taking care of bison community perceptions of the Hook Lake Wood Bison Recovery Project in Fort Resolution, N.T., Canada. Ottawa: National Library of Canada = Bibliothèque nationale du Canada. 

Communities in the South Slave Region
Dene communities
Hamlets in the Northwest Territories
Heritage sites in the Northwest Territories
National Historic Sites in the Northwest Territories
Hudson's Bay Company forts
Populated places established in 1819